Woburn is a city in Middlesex County, Massachusetts, United States. The population was 40,876 at the 2020 census. Woburn uses Massachusetts' mayor-council form of government, in which an elected mayor is the executive and a partly district-based, partly at-large city council is the legislature. It is the only one of Massachusetts' 351 municipalities to refer to members of its City Council as "Aldermen."

History 
Woburn was first settled in 1640 near Horn Pond, a primary source of the Mystic River, and was officially incorporated in 1642. At that time the area included present day towns of Woburn, Winchester, Burlington, and parts of Stoneham and Wilmington.  In 1740 Wilmington separated from Woburn. In 1799 Burlington separated from Woburn; in 1850 Winchester did so, too.

Woburn got its name from Woburn, Bedfordshire.  Woburn played host to the first religious ordination in the Americas on Nov. 22, 1642. Rev. Thomas Carter was sworn in by many of the most prominent men of New England including John Cotton, minister of the First Church of Boston, Richard Mather minister of the First Church of Dorchester, and Capt. Edward Johnson co-founder of the church and town of Woburn. Johnson is regarded as "the father of Woburn."  He served as the first town clerk, represented the town in the Massachusetts General Court, made the first map of Massachusetts, and wrote the first history of the colony.

The first organizational Town Meeting was held on April 13, 1644, and the first town officers were chosen. Town Selectmen were Edward Johnson, Edward Convers, John Mousall, William Learned, Ezekiel Richardson, Samuel Richardson and James Thompson. William Learned was also selected as Constable. Michael Bacon, Ralph Hill, Thomas Richardson were chosen as Surveyors of Highways. (The History of Woburn, 1868)

Deacon Edward Convers was also one of the founders of Woburn.  He was one of its first selectmen, and built the first house and first mill in Woburn.  He was very active in town affairs and was a large landowner, miller and surveyor.

List of important events
Gershom Flagg's tannery was built in 1668
The Middlesex Canal was opened in 1803
Thompson established a tannery at Cummingsville in 1823
The Boston and Lowell Railroad started operating through Woburn in 1835
The Woburn Sentinel newspaper began in 1839
In 1840 the first membership library opened
The telegraph started operating in Woburn in 1867
"America's oldest active gun club," the Massachusetts Rifle Association, was founded in 1875 and moved to Woburn in 1876.
The public library opened in 1879
The telephone was introduced in Woburn in 1882; Electric lights in 1885
Woburn was incorporated as a City on June 12, 1888
Route 128 opened in 1951
Route 93 was built through the town in 1963
Rail depot closed in 1962.
Cummings Properties, the major holder of commercial properties in the region, was founded in 1970.
Cummings Foundation was established in 1986.
Cummings Foundation purchased the former Choate Memorial Hospital site and turned it into the New Horizons of Choate senior living community in 1990.
Community Weeklies Inc. was founded by William S. Cummings and began publishing Woburn Advocate in 1991. The firm was bought by a division of Fidelity Investments in 1994, and Woburn Advocate is now being published by GateHouse Media.
Middlesex Superior Courthouse moved to TradeCenter 128 business campus in 2008.
The final phase of construction is completed on TradeCenter 128 business campus in 2010.
Woburn Police Officer John B. Maguire was killed in the line of duty while responding to an armed robbery on December 26, 2010.
Massachusetts Biotechnology Council awarded Woburn the platinum-level "Bio-Ready community" designation in 2011.

Groundwater contamination incident 
Woburn was the scene of a high-profile water contamination crisis.  During the mid to late 1970s, the local community became concerned over the high incidence of childhood leukemia and other illnesses, particularly in the Pine Street area of east Woburn. After high levels of chemical contamination were found in City of Woburn's Wells G and H in 1979, some members of the community suspected that the unusually high incidence of leukemia, cancer, and a wide variety of other health problems were linked to the possible exposure to volatile organic compounds in the groundwater pumped from wells G and H.

In May 1982, a number of citizens whose children had developed or died from leukemia filed a civil lawsuit against two corporations, W. R. Grace and Company and Beatrice Foods. Grace's subsidiary, Cryovac, and Beatrice were suspected of contaminating the groundwater by improperly disposing of trichloroethylene (TCE), perchloroethylene (perc or PCE) and other industrial solvents at their facilities in Woburn near wells G and H.

In a controversial decision, Judge Walter Jay Skinner ruled that the jurors should answer questions that they and many others considered confusing. Beatrice was acquitted and Grace only paid $8 million, a third of which went to  the lawyers and lawyer fees. A United States Environmental Protection Agency report later found Beatrice and Grace responsible for the contamination.
A book titled A Civil Action was written about the case by Jonathan Harr. In 1998 the book was turned into a movie starring John Travolta and Robert Duvall, also titled A Civil Action. The film was largely filmed in nearby Bedford and Lexington, with only a few shots on location in Woburn.

Geography

Woburn is located at  (42.484545, −71.152060).  It is bordered by the towns of Wilmington, Reading, Stoneham, Winchester, Lexington, and Burlington.

Climate 

Woburn features a humid continental climate, similar to those of many of the other Boston suburban areas. It features moderately cold winters, but not usually as bad as the ones around The Great Lakes Regions or Southern Canada, or even Northern New England. Nonetheless, it features occasional 'arctic blasts' which can easily drop the temperature below zero. Spring generally starts out cool, around 45-50 degrees, often with snow still on the ground. However, it quickly begins to rapidly warm to around 75 degrees by the time summer begins. Summers are generally warm or hot & often accompanied with humidity, though not nearly as bad as cities in The Midwest & Mid-Atlantic, and even Rhode Island. Temperatures often top in the 80s, but when an Atlantic low comes, temperatures may fail to rise out of the 60s. High pressure from the Gulf of Mexico, occasionally brings much hotter conditions with temperatures sometimes topping near 100, though this is fairly rare and only happens so often. Falls are generally crisp, but start out warm with temperature highs around 70 & lows around 50. Quickly things cool, and it feels and looks like winter with temperatures around 40 usually towards the end. Like most of the region, temperatures can vary widely in the span of a day.

Demographics

As of the census of 2000, there were 37,258 people (37,010 by 2006 estimate), 14,997 households, and 9,658 families residing in the city. The racial makeup of the city was 90.57% White, 1.87% African American, 0.10% Native American, 4.85% Asian, 0.05% Pacific Islander, 1.44% from other races, and 1.13% from two or more races. Hispanic or Latino of any race were 3.09% of the population.

There were 14,997 households, out of which 26.8% had children under the age of 18 living with them, 49.5% were married couples living together, 10.9% had a female householder with no husband present, and 35.6% were non-families. 28.7% of all households were made up of individuals, and 10.1% had someone living alone who was 65 years of age or older. The average household size was 2.47 and the average family size was 3.09.

In the city, the population was spread out, with 21.1% under the age of 18, 6.9% from 18 to 24, 34.9% from 25 to 44, 21.8% from 45 to 64, and 15.4% who were 65 years of age or older. The median age was 38 years. For every 100 females, there were 95.6 males. For every 100 females age 18 and over, there were 93.1 males.

The median income for a household in the city was $54,897, and the median income for a family was $66,364. Males had a median income of $45,210 versus $33,239 for females. The per capita income for the city was $26,207. About 4.5% of families and 6.1% of the population were below the poverty line, including 7.9% of those under age 18 and 5.4% of those age 65 or over.

Economy
The Woburn Business Association (WBA) is a membership organization consisting of companies located in Woburn, Massachusetts. Memberships are also available to those firms who are situated elsewhere, but do business in Woburn.  The purpose of the WBA is to promote and protect Business Interests in the City of Woburn and provide Networking Services for the Business Community.

The WBA Board of Directors meets monthly to develop policy and provide direction for the Association. The Executive Committee meets periodically, usually on an "as needed" basis, to review important issues and make recommendations to the Board regarding WBA policy.  The WBA accomplishes its work through committees of WBA members and representatives of the Woburn community. The membership is encouraged to actively participate on these committees.

The Woburn Redevelopment Authority is an independent municipal urban renewal authority established by the City of Woburn in 1961, in accordance with Massachusetts General Laws Chapter 121B.  The Authority is governed by five members, four of whom are appointed by the Mayor, and one by the Governor.  The WRA functions as the City's community development agency, under an agreement with the City of Woburn executed in July 2000.

Companies based in Woburn include Boston Acoustics, Kaspersky Lab USA, Monotype, Skyworks Solutions, and U-Turn Audio.

Top employers

According to the Massachusetts Executive Office of Labor and Workforce Development, the top employers in the city are:

Education

Woburn's public elementary schools are the Goodyear Elementary, Altavesta Elementary, Shamrock Elementary, Malcolm White Elementary, Clyde Reeves Elementary, Linscott-Rumford Elementary, and Hurld-Wyman Elementary. The Hurld and Wyman Schools have been closed down and a new school (the Hurld-Wyman) has been built on a portion of the city's Spence Farm property. (The Clapp, Parker, Tarkey, Plympton, Golden, and Veterans' Memorial Schools are now closed, and the former Veterans' Memorial School now serves as the Woburn Senior Center.)  The two middle schools are the John F. Kennedy Middle School and the Daniel L. Joyce Middle School.

In recent years the Goodyear, Reeves, Shamrock, and Malcolm White, as well as Woburn Memorial High School, have been rebuilt. The Hurld-Wyman sits on a portion of the city's Spence Farm property.

St. Charles, a Pre-K–8 private Catholic school, is part of the adjacent St. Charles Parish. It has been graduating classes since 1884 in grades K–8; the high school closed in 1972.

Public water
Woburn is one of the few communities close to Boston which provides its own drinking water. The City’s water supply mostly comes from five wells from the underground aquifer within the Horn Pond area, which is then filtered and treated at the Horn Pond Treatment Plant. About one-third of the water is supplemented by the Massachusetts Water Resources Authority.

Transportation

 Anderson Regional Transportation Center is a transit hub, with Amtrak service to Portland, Maine, and MBTA Commuter Rail service to Boston's North Station and Lowell, Massachusetts, as well as bus service to Logan International Airport and Manchester-Boston Regional Airport
 Mishawum is a stop on the MBTA Commuter Rail's Lowell Line that currently has only limited reverse rush hour service.
 MBTA bus routes also run through Woburn along its main roads, such as Main Street, Montvale Ave., Lexington Street and Cambridge Road. The routes run north to Burlington and Wilmington and south to Boston.

Notable people
 Samuel Warren Abbott, physician
 Jane Kelley Adams, educator
 Col. Loammi Baldwin, Revolutionary War engineer, builder of  Middlesex Canal
 Eric Bogosian, actor, playwright and novelist
 John Carter, former Boston Bruins player
 Edward Convers, founder of Woburn
 Christopher J. Coyne, Roman Catholic Bishop of Burlington
 William Emmett Dever, mayor of Chicago
 Charles Goodyear, inventor of vulcanized rubber
 John Martyn Harlow, financier, civic leader, physician to Phineas Gage
 Edward Johnson, "Father of Woburn"
 Courtney Kennedy, dual Olympic medalist in hockey
 Elaine J. McCarthy, projection designer for Broadway theater and opera
 Charles McMahon, Marine Corporal, one of final two American servicemen killed in Vietnam War
 Julia O'Connor, labor leader
 Ernest Cushing Richardson, librarian, theologian and scholar
 David Robinson, rock drummer
 Charlie Sayles, blues harmonicist, singer and songwriter
 Betsey Ann Stearns, inventor
 Benjamin Thompson, Count Rumford, scientist and inventor
 Lyle R. Wheeler, 5-time Academy Award-winning art-director
 Philemon Wright, regarded as founder of Canadian cities Ottawa, Ontario, and Gatineau, Quebec
 George S. Zimbel, photographer

Points of interest 
 1790 House
 Baldwin House
 Benjamin Thompson House
 Winn Memorial Library
 Woburn Memorial High School
 US Post Office, National Register-listed Classical Revival building
 First Congregational Church in Woburn, 1860 church belonging to a 1642 congregation

References

Further reading

 Chronological History of Woburn.
 Ebenezer Locke Revolutionary War soldier from Woburn.
 1871 Atlas of Massachusetts by Wall & Gray  Map of Massachusetts. Map of Middlesex County
 History of Middlesex County, Massachusetts,  Volume 1 (A-H), Volume 2 (L-W) compiled by Samuel Adams Drake, published 1879–1880. 572 and 505 pages. Woburn article by George M. Chamney in volume 2, pages 526–554.
 The History of Woburn, Middlesex County, Massachusetts, by Samuel Sewall, Charles Chauncy Sewall, Samuel Thompson; published 1868, 657 pages.
 Old USGS Maps of Woburn.

External links

 Woburn official website
 Woburn Historical Society Website

 
Cities in Massachusetts
Populated places established in 1640
Cities in Middlesex County, Massachusetts
1640 establishments in Massachusetts